Sobota  is a village in the administrative district of Gmina Bielawy, within Łowicz County, Łódź Voivodeship, in central Poland. The village has a population of 560. The name literally means "Saturday".

Sobota was the site of the Battle of Sobota (1655), when a Polish force failed to head off the advancing Swedish invading army.

References

Villages in Łowicz County
Łódź Voivodeship (1919–1939)